Nanban-ji (南蛮寺, also pronounced Nanbandera) is a name applied to spaces or structures used by Christian missionaries and Japanese Christian converts in the early history of the Catholic Church in Japan. Whether converted from existing temples or built for purpose as churches and centers for Christian education, buildings known as Nanban-ji (temple of/for the southern barbarians) were present in Kyōto, Nagasaki, Hirado, Azuchi, Osaka, Kanazawa, Sunpu, and Edo.
Structures known as Nanban-ji were destroyed from Toyotomi Hideyoshi's 1588 edict against Christians in Japan, with some fragments of construction remaining and eventually being deposited in museums. There are also depictions in contemporary art, and in the narratives of missionaries such as Luís Fróis.

See also
Christianity in Japan
Nanban art,  Japanese art of the sixteenth and seventeenth centuries influenced by contact with the Nanban
Nanban trade, trade between Japan and Western countries from 1543 to 1614

References 

History of Christianity in Japan
History of Catholicism in Asia
Catholic Church in Japan